"This Could Be the Start of Something" (generally known as "This Could Be the Start of Something Big") is a popular song by Steve Allen, published in 1956.

Background
Originally, the song was written as part of the score for the 1954 television musical production of The Bachelor. This score earned Allen a Sylvania Award (awarded "For Outstanding Contribution to Creative Television Technique").

In 1956, "This Could be the Start of Something" replaced the original opening theme to Allen's NBC talk show, Tonight Starring Steve Allen, until Allen left the show in 1957 to be replaced by Jack Paar. It became something of a personal theme song for him, being used as the opening to his other talk and variety shows, as well as during the opening of both the CBS and syndicated versions of I've Got a Secret during his time as host.

Cover versions
A number of performers have covered this song, including: 
Count Basie
Tony Bennett
Bobby Darin
Ella Fitzgerald
Aretha Franklin
Judy Garland
Grant Green
Lionel Hampton
J. J. Johnson and Kai Winding
Jack Jones
Mark Murphy
Oscar Peterson
Nelson Riddle
The Ray Charles Singers
Steve and Eydie
Pia Zadora.
Lawrence Welk covered this song in his program's New Year's Eve show of 1970.

References

1956 songs
Songs written by Steve Allen
Television talk show theme songs